Khari Iman Mitchell Samuel (born October 14, 1976) is a former American football linebacker who played with the Chicago Bears and Detroit Lions in the National Football League. He played college football at Massachusetts.

College career
Samuel played high school football at Framingham High School in Framingham, Massachusetts and signed on to play at UMass.   While at UMass he was a first-team All-American and first-team All-Atlantic 10 Conference selection who helped lead the Minutemen to their first ever national championship in 1998.  Samuel finished his career as UMass’ all-time leader in solo tackles with 328, while ranking second in total tackles (495), fourth in assisted tackles (167) and seventh
in sacks (19). As a senior in 1998, he recorded the second-highest single season total in school history for solo tackles (113), while ranking third on the list for total tackles (160).

Professional career

Chicago Bears
Samuel was a 5th round selection (144th overall) by the Chicago Bears in the 1999 NFL Draft.  In his rookie season with Chicago, Samuel would appear in 13 games, making one start at linebacker and also playing on special teams.  He recorded nine solo tackles and six assists while recovering one fumble.

In 2000 Samuel would appear in all 16 games for the Bears, primarily on special teams.

Samuel would start 2001 with Chicago but was cut after just one game.

Detroit Lions
Samuel would quickly be signed by the Detroit Lions and played in nine games, again playing on special teams.  At the end of the season, he was cut from the Lions active roster.

Houston Texans
In 2002 Samuel signed a contract with the Houston Texans to attempt to make the team in training camp. Samuel would be cut by the Texans on August 31, 2002.

References

External links
 UMASS page
 Career Stats

1976 births
Living people
Players of American football from New York (state)
African-American players of American football
American football linebackers
UMass Minutemen football players
Chicago Bears players
Detroit Lions players
Framingham High School alumni
21st-century African-American sportspeople
20th-century African-American sportspeople